The Stade Olympique de Sousse is a multi-purpose stadium in Sousse, Tunisia.  It is used by the football team Étoile du Sahel, and was used for the 2004 African Cup of Nations.  The stadium holds 50,000 people.
It hosts within it the meetings played by the football team of the city: Étoile sportive du Sahel (ESS).

It hosted 1977 FIFA U-20 World Cup, 1994 African Cup of Nations, 2001 Mediterranean Games and 2004 African Cup of Nations.

History
For many decades, Sousse footballers knew only the clay surfaces and knew the turf surfaces only when the stadium was inaugurated with an initial capacity of 10,000 places.
It passes over the years to 15,000 seats and is then expanded again on the occasion of the 1994 African Cup of Nations with 6,000 additional seats to reach a capacity of 21,000 seats; A luminous panel is installed at the same time. 
The last expansion was carried out in 1999 to bring the capacity of the stadium to 28,000 seats for the 2001 Mediterranean Games, a reorganization of the gallery of honor was carried out, from a capacity of 70 to 217 places. The stadium has yet to be expanded to reach the capacity of 49,000 seats after the announcement the president of the club Moez Driss in May 2008.

The Olympic Stadium of Sousse also hosted some of the Libyan national team’s matches due to the Libyan war, such as Libya and Rwanda in the 2018 World Cup qualification.

Renovation
In November 2017, on a visit to the President of the Republic, Beji Caid Essebsi, to Sousse, he gave an indication of the beginning of the expansion of the stadium and thus in March 2019, the inauguration ceremony of the beginning of works of the Stadium was attended by the Minister of Youth and Sports, Sonia Ben Cheikh, in order to be able to accommodate 40,000 spectators instead of 28,000.

The cost of completing the total works was estimated at 32 million dinars, including 4 million dinars as a contribution from the Municipality of Sousse and 2 million dinars from the contribution of the team and coastal and is expected to include the expansion of the stadium, which will extend for 27 months, especially covered runways and open runways in the east and north and south will also include works. The rehabilitation of the wardrooms, the rehabilitation of the health units for the public, the creation of 22 cells and the complete restoration of electricity networks.

Tunisia national football team

The following national team matches were held in the stadium.

Major tournaments

1977 FIFA U-20 World Cup
Stade Olympique de Sousse served as a venue for the tournament. It hosted all the matches of Group C. The games were:

1994 Africa Cup of Nations
Stade Olympique de Sousse served as a venue for the tournament. It hosted six matches of the group stage, and two matches of quarter-finals. The games were:

2001 Mediterranean Games
Stade Olympique de Sousse served as a venue for the tournament. It hosted all the matches of Group B. The games were:

2004 Africa Cup of Nations
Stade Olympique de Sousse served as a venue for the tournament. It hosted four matches of the group stage, and one match of semi-finals. The games were:

References

External links
Photos of Stadiums in Tunisia at cafe.daum.net/stade
Stade Olympique de Sousse
Stadium Guide

Sousse
Sousse
Multi-purpose stadiums in Tunisia
Étoile Sportive du Sahel